Barda is a census town in Sutahata CD block in Haldia subdivision of Purba Medinipur district in the state of West Bengal, India.

Geography

Location

Urbanisation
79.19% of the population of Haldia subdivision live in the rural areas. Only 20.81% of the population live in the urban areas, and that is the highest proportion of urban population amongst the four subdivisions in Purba Medinipur district.

Note: The map alongside presents some of the notable locations in the subdivision. All places marked in the map are linked in the larger full screen map.

Demographics
As per 2011 Census of India Barda had a total population of 5,155 of which 2,617 (51%) were males and 2,538 (49%) were females. Population below 6 years was 556. The total number of literates in Barda was 4,103 (89.22% of the population over 6 years).

Infrastructure
As per the District Census Handbook 2011, Barda covered an area of 3.3186 km2. It had the facility of a railway station and bus services in the town. Amongst the civic amenities it had 500 domestic electric connections. Amongst the medical facilities it had were a hospital with 15 beds 1 km away and 11 medicine shops. Amongst the educational facilities it had were 4 primary schools. The nearest middle school and secondary school were at Kesabpur close by.  The nearest senior secondary school was at Bajitpur close by. The nearest degree college was at  Keshabpur.

Transport
Barda is on the Haldia-Kurahati Road. Barda railway station is situated on the Panskura-Haldia line.

Education
Vivekananda Mission Mahavidyalaya at PO Chaitanyapur, located nearby, was established in 1968. It offers courses in arts, science and commerce.

References

Cities and towns in Purba Medinipur district